Nandamuri Balakrishna (born 10 June 1960), simply known as Balakrishna or Balayya or NBK, is an Indian actor, producer and politician. He appeared in more than 100 Telugu films over forty years in a variety of roles and established himself as one of the leading actors of Telugu cinema. He won three Nandi Awards and one South Indian International Movie Award. He is an elected member of the Andhra Pradesh Legislative Assembly from Hindupuram constituency since 2014.

The sixth son of veteran Telugu film actor and former Chief Minister of Andhra Pradesh N. T. Rama Rao, Balakrishna entered the film industry as a child artist at the age of 14 with the film Tatamma Kala (1974) and has acted in more than a hundred feature films in varied roles. He has achieved commercial success, since the 1980s, in films such as, Sahasame Jeevitham (1984), Janani Janmabhoomi (1984), Mangammagari Manavadu (1984), Apoorva Sahodarulu (1986), Muvva Gopaludu (1987), Muddula Mavayya (1989), Nari Nari Naduma Murari (1990), Lorry Driver (1990), Aditya 369 (1991), Rowdy Inspector (1992), Bangaru Bullodu (1993), Bhairava Dweepam (1994), Peddannayya (1997), Samarasimha Reddy (1999), Narasimha Naidu (2001), Chennakesava Reddy (2002), Simha (2010), Legend (2014), Gautamiputra Satakarni (2017), Akhanda (2021) and Veera Simha Reddy (2023). Some of these films earned him accolades, as well.

He has also acted in biographical, historical and hagiographical films. He played poet Vemulawada Bheemakavi in Vemulawada Bheemakavi (1976); Abhimanyu in Daana Veera Soora Karna (1977); Jahangir in Akbar Salim Anarkali (1979); Narada in Sri Tirupati Venkateswara Kalyanam (1979); Sidda in Srimadvirat Veerabrahmendra Swami Charitra (1984) which was screened at the Moscow Film Festival; Krishnadevaraya in Aditya 369 (1991) which was screened at the International Film Festival of India; Satya Harischandra and Dushyanta in Brahmarshi Vishwamitra (1991); Lord Krishna and Arjuna in Sri Krishnarjuna Vijayam (1996); Pundarika in Pandurangadu (2008); his father, N. T. Rama Rao, in NTR: Mahanayakudu (2019) and NTR: Kathanayakudu (2019); and Lord Rama in Sri Rama Rajyam (2011) which received special mention at the International Film Festival of India.

In his 100th film, he played Gautamiputra Satakarni, second-century ruler of the Satavahana dynasty in the epic war film Gautamiputra Satakarni (2017). The film was screened at the first "Edinburgh Festival of Indian Films and Documentaries". Balakrishna has received three state Nandi Awards for Best Actor for his works in Narasimha Naidu (2001), Simha (2010), and Legend (2014) as of 2014. In 2014, he received the South Indian International Movie Award for best actor for his work in Legend. Balakrishna serves as the Chairman of Basavatarakam Indo-American Cancer Hospital and Research.

Early life and family
Nandamuri Balakrishna was born on 10 June 1960 in Madras (present-day Chennai, Tamil Nadu) to Telugu actor and three-time Chief Minister of Andhra Pradesh N. T. Rama Rao and his wife Basavatarakam. As the Telugu film industry was based in Madras at that time, he spent his entire childhood in Madras. During his adolescence, he moved to Hyderabad following the shift of the Telugu film industry to that city. He earned a bachelor's degree in commerce from Nizam College, Hyderabad.

In 1982, at the age of 22, Balakrishna married Vasundhara Devi, and they have three children: two daughters, Nara Brahmani and Tejaswini Mathukumilli and a son, Nandamuri Mokshagna Taraka Rama Teja. Balakrishna's elder son-in-law Nara Lokesh is a politician and son of former Andhra Pradesh Chief Minister Nara Chandrababu Naidu. His younger son-in-law Sribharat Mathukumilli is the grandson of M.V.V.S. Murthi and is the current president of Gandhi Institute of Technology and Management.

Acting career

Starting years (1974)
Balakrishna made his acting debut as a child artiste in Tatamma Kala, which was directed by N. T. Rama Rao, his father. He acted in several films, many of which were directed by his father, including Daana Veera Soora Karna (1977), Sri Madvirata Parvam (1979), Akbar Salim Anarkali (1979) and Sri Tirupati Venkateswara Kalyanam (1979). At the age of 16, he acted in a movie titled Annadammula Anubandham (1975), a remake of Dharmendra's Hindi movie Yaadon Ki Baaraat, and played a brother to his real life father, Rama Rao. Balakrishna appeared as son to his real life brother Nandamuri Harikrishna in the movie Dana Veera Sura Karna.

In 1984, he debuted in an adult role with Sahasame Jeevitham. He then starred in the drama film Mangammagari Manavadu the same year, alongside Bhanumathi and Suhasini, directed by Kodi Ramakrishna. In the same year, he acted in Kathanayakudu and in the biographical film Shrimad Virat Veerabrahmendra Swami Charitra. He also appeared in Janani Janmabhoomi in 1984, directed by K. Viswanath. In 1985, he acted with Akkineni Nageswara Rao in the film Bharyabhartala Bandham, alongside Rajani. In 1986, he acted in movies such as Muddula Krishnayya, Seetharama Kalyanam, Anasuyamma Gari Alludu and Deshoddharakudu, which gradually increased his potential at the box office.

1987–1999
In 1987, Balakrishna acted in a dual role in the film Apoorva Sahodarulu, directed by K. Raghavendra Rao. In the same year, he starred in President Gari Abbai, directed by T. Rama Rao and Muvva Gopaludu, by Kodi Ramakrishna. His other films like Inspector Pratap, Bharatamlo Bala Chandrudu, Tiragabadda Telugubidda, Raktabhishekam were also successful at the box office. In 1989, he paired with Vijayashanti in Muddula Mavayya directed by Kodi Ramakrishna. In 1990, he acted in Nari Nari Naduma Murari, directed by A. Kodandarami Reddy, alongside Shobana and Nirosha. In the same year, he appeared in B. Gopal's Lorry Driver, opposite Vijayashanti.

In 1991, he acted in science fiction film Aditya 369, directed by Singeetam Srinivasa Rao. This was the only science fiction film in Telugu cinema during that period of time. He then had two releases in 1992, Dharma Kshetram with Divya Bharathi and Rowdy Inspector, directed by B. Gopal. In 1993, he had two releases on the same day, which are Nippu Ravva, alongside Shobana and Vijayashanti, directed by A. Kodandarami Reddy; Bangaru Bullodu, alongside Raveena Tandon and Ramya Krishna, directed by Ravi Raja Pinisetty. His next appearance was a role in Bhairava Dweepam in 1994, directed by Singeetam Srinivasa Rao. In Brahmarshi Viswamitra, directed by NTR, he played as Satya Harischandra and Dushyanta. Between 1994 and 1999, he acted in movies such as Bobbili Simham, Vamsanikokkadu, Peddannayya and moderate successes such as Top Hero, Muddula Mogudu, Maato Pettukoku, Raana and Pavitra Prema. In the year 1999, he acted in B. Gopal's action film Samarasimha Reddy, opposite Simran and Anjala Zhaveri.

2000–2009
In 2000, Balakrishna acted in Goppinti Alludu, directed by E. V. V. Satyanarayana with Simran. In 2001, he starred in the B. Gopal-directed faction film Narasimha Naidu, opposite Simran once again. The film became the highest-grossing Telugu film of all time until the record was broken by Chiranjeevi's Indra, which was also directed by B. Gopal. Balakrishna won his first Nandi Award for Best Actor for his performance. In the same year, he appeared in Bhalevadivi Basu with Shilpa Shetty and Anjala Zaveri. His 2002 and 2003 films include Seema Simham and Chennakesava Reddy. The former received unfavourable reviews and was a box office flop, but the latter one was critically and financially successful. In 2004, he performed in a remake of the 2003 Tamil film Saamy, titled Lakshmi Narasimha, with Asin. The film and Balakrishna's performance won critical acclaim and was a financial success. During the period, he also announced plans to act and direct in the remake of Nartanasala, starred by his father, and a launch event was held in Hyderabad in March 2003. Produced by Pusapati Lakshmipati Raju, the film was announced to have an ensemble cast also featuring Soundarya, Srihari, Saikumar, Uday Kiran and Asin in lead roles. However, despite a grand launch, the film was later shelved following the sudden demise of Soundarya.

The years from 2005 to 2009 saw action-drama flicks such as Vijayendra Varma, Veerabhadra, Allari Pidugu, Okka Magaadu and Maharathi which did not perform well at the box office. He paired with Sneha and Tabu in the mythological movie Pandurangadu (2008), directed by K. Raghavendra Rao. He played the dual roles of Krishna and Panduranga. Rediff described his performance as "Balakrishna does justice to both the roles of God and Ranga. He shines in the climax of the movie. It's quite a task to step into NTR's shoes, but his son has done pretty well, though one does miss NTR in the role of Krishna!". The film was an average success and his performance won him the Santosham Best Actor Award. In the year 2009, he starred in the family drama Mitrudu, alongside Priyamani in a slightly different role – that of a dependable friend and confidante to the female lead. The film opened to average reviews.

2010–present
In 2010, Balakrishna acted in Boyapati Srinu's film Simha, alongside Nayantara and Sneha Ullal. He played a dual role as father and son. The film opened to positive reviews, and went on to become the highest-grossing Telugu film of the year. A review in Rediff said about his performance: "Balakrishna has put in a restrained performance. Though his character is supposed to roar at times, he seems subdued most of the time. But he's given plenty to be pleased about as it is his show all the way." In 2011, he acted in the mythological film Sri Rama Rajyam, based on the epic Ramayana. He played a triple role in the 2012 action drama Adhinayakudu as grandfather, father and grandson. Balakrishna was the chief guest for the 43rd International Film Festival of India, 2012. In 2014, he acted in Boyapati Srinu's film Legend, alongside Sonal Chauhan and Jagapathi Babu. He played the title role in the biographical and historical film Gautamiputra Satakarni, his 100th film. The film is directed by Krish and is based on the life of the 2nd century ruler of the Satavahana dynasty, Gautamiputra Satakarni. In 2018, he acted in Jai Simha, which was directed by K. S. Ravikumar and started shooting for the N.T.R. biopic in which he reprised the role of his father. The film was made in two parts, the first part NTR: Kathanayakudu was released on 9 January 2019, with the second NTR: Mahanayakudu on 22 February 2019. His 2021 movie Akhanda marks third collaboration with director Boyapati Srinu, featuring his dual role as Aghori Baba and a farmer. It was a super hit at the box office.

International Film Festival of India (IFFI)
In 2012 the Governor of Goa, B. V. Wanchoo, the Chief Minister Manohar Parrikar and Balakrishna were seen along with award winners and other dignitaries at the closing ceremony of the 43rd edition of the IFFI. Balakrishna, in his speech, said that although the Telugu film industry finds no place in the film festival by way of representation its films, 80 percent of the movies that are produced in India are in regional languages, out of which Fifty percent are from South India. "Today, film industry is facing competition from radio, and television as also from piracy," he stated. He also maintained that the film festivals have enlarged his vision towards his career.

Political career
Since the founding of the Telugu Desam Party (TDP), Balakrishna campaigned for it in every election, but didn't enter the electoral battle until 2014. During a vacation to his father-in-law's house, he went on a political campaign for TDP all over East Godavari district. He contested the 2014 Andhra Pradesh Legislative Assembly elections on behalf of TDP and won the Hindupur Assembly Constituency seat with a reasonable majority. Hindupur, in Anantapur district, has been a TDP stronghold since 1983. It was once represented by his father and later for a term by his brother Nandamuri Harikrishna. Balakrishna is the third from the family to represent it in the State Assembly.

Controversies
Balakrishna was involved in a shootout controversy which took place on 3 June 2004 around 8:50 PM at his residence in Jubilee Hills, Hyderabad. He allegedly fired shots at producer Bellamkonda Suresh and his associate, Satyanarayana Chowdhary. Later, both the wounded were admitted into Apollo hospital. Allegedly, Balakrishna shot Bellamkonda out of self defense, due to the producer attacking him with a "paper knife".  The circumstances under which the case was handled led to controversy as purported by the Human Rights Forum (HRF). The HRF questioned the authenticity of people who handled the case, and the circumstances under which Balakrishna was shielded from police by being given refuge in Care Hospital without any justifiable cause.

The two victims gave statements before the magistrate, alleging that Balakrishna fired shots at them, but later retracted their earlier statements. Balakrishna was later arrested on 6 June and produced before Fifth Metropolitan Magistrate. A show cause notice was also served to Balakrishna's wife Vasundhara Devi as the weapon used was registered to her, and she could not give sufficient protection to her weapon. Later, Balakrishna was granted bail on the conditions that he should not leave Hyderabad without the court's permission and to surrender his passport.

Filmography

Awards 

Nandi Awards
 Best Actor – Narasimha Naidu (2001)
 Best Actor – Simha (2010)
 Best Actor – Legend (2014)

CineMAA Awards
 CineMAA Award for Best Actor - Male – Simha (2010)

Santosham Film Awards
 Santosham Best Actor Award – Pandurangadu
 Santosham Best Actor Award – Simha
 Santosham Best Actor Award – Sri Rama Rajyam

TSR National Awards
 Best Actor Award for the year 2010 – Male – Simha
 Best Actor Award for the year 2011 – Male – Sri Rama Rajyam
 Best Actor Award for the year 2014 – Male – Legend

SIIMA Awards
 Best Actor – Legend
 Entertainer of the Year – Akhanda

Other Awards

 Samman Award – Highest taxpayer in the charge of Commissioner of Income Tax.
 Bharata Muni award for Best Actor of the year 2009 – Pandurangadu
 Bharata Muni award Best Actor of the year 2010 – Simha
 Bharata Muni award Best Actor of the year 2011 – Sri Rama Rajyam
 A.P. CINE Goers Association Best Actor Award – Narasimha Naidu Chennakesava Reddy and Pandurangadu.
 Akkineni Abhinaya Puraskaram for the year 2007
South Indian Cinematographers Awards 2015 Best Actor –Legend

Nominations
Filmfare Awards South
 Best Actor – Telugu – Narasimha Naidu
 Best Actor – Telugu – Simha
 Best Actor – Telugu – Sri Rama Rajyam
 Best Actor – Telugu – Gauthamiputra Satakarni
 Best Actor – Telugu – Muvva Gopaludu
 Best Actor – Telugu – Aditya 369

References

External links

 

1960 births
Living people
Indian male film actors
Telugu Desam Party politicians
Male actors in Telugu cinema
Politicians from Hyderabad, India
Male actors from Chennai
20th-century Indian male actors
Nandi Award winners
CineMAA Awards winners
South Indian International Movie Awards winners
Indian male child actors
Indian actor-politicians
21st-century Indian male actors
Telugu male actors
Andhra Pradesh MLAs 2014–2019
Telugu politicians
Male actors from Hyderabad, India
Politicians from Chennai
Andhra Pradesh MLAs 2019–2024
Indian television talk show hosts